Meat Products of India Ltd (MPI) is a major Indian meat processing, packaging, and distribution company based in Edayar, Koothattukulam in the district of Ernakulam, Kerala.

Established in 1973, MPI is a public sector undertaking. The company holds a category A No.1 license from the Ministry of Food Processing Industries, Government of India for the manufacture and marketing of meat and meat products.

Products

Products include beef, buffalo, pork, mutton, rabbit and poultry. The processed and semi-cooked products include corn beef, meat loaf, sausages, curries, bacon, ham, cutlet-mix, chicken-n-ham and salami. They also export a rissole (labelled as continental sausage) to Australia.  Currently, the company produces more than 65 varieties of items.

Competency
In tune with the varied demands of the market, the above range of products are available in different weights and quantity in poly packings and cans.

Meat Products of India Ltd. is a Kerala Government owned company engaged in production and marketing of various meat and meat products derived from pork, beef, chicken, muton, rabbit and quails. It holds MFPO Licence No.1 under A. The products are manufactured under strict veterinary supervision from selected animals free from zoonotic disease. MPI products are available with all leading supermarkets and cold storages throughout Kerala and other states.

References
 Meat Products of India Limited

External links
 Meat Products of India official website

1973 establishments in Kerala
Meat companies of India
Companies based in Kochi
Brand name meats
Food and drink companies established in 1973
Ham producers
Government agencies established in 1973
Government-owned companies of Kerala